Chelsea Vowel, who often writes as âpihtawikosisân (Cree syllabics: , IPA: , i.e., Métis, lit. "half-son"), is a Métis writer and lawyer from near Lac Ste. Anne, Alberta, whose work focuses on language, gender identity, and cultural resurgence. She has been published in the Huffington Post, The National Post, and The Globe and Mail. Co-host of the podcast Métis in Space and runner of the IndigenousXca Twitter account, Vowel has been noted as a "prominent and respected Métis blogger" and "one of the most visible of [the] new generation" of Métis intellectuals.

, Vowel was completing a master's student in Native Studies and was a Cree language instructor at the University of Alberta.

Education 
Vowel received a Bachelor in Education degree from the University of Alberta in 2000.  After graduating, she taught in Inuvik, Northwest Territories, before returning to graduate with Bachelor of Law degree in 2009. After completing her law degree, she moved to Montreal, where she worked with Inuit youth who were in the foster care system, including those sentenced under the Youth Criminal Justice Act. In 2016, she returned to Alberta to begin a Masters program in Native Studies at the University of Alberta.

Writing 
In 2014, she published two essays in the collection The Winter We Danced: Voices From the Past, the Future, and the Idle No More Movement.

In 2016, she released her first book, Indigenous Writes: A Guide to First Nations, Métis & Inuit Issues in Canada, a collection of essays aimed at explaining Indigenous issues in the Canadian context to non-Indigenous people. The collection was praised for Vowel's "caustic style and astute insights" and compared favorably to Thomas King's The Inconvenient Indian. It earned Vowel a nomination for the Concordia University First Book Prize.  Indigenous Writes was also featured on numerous 2017 and 2018 to-read lists by the CBC, Globe and Mail, and other publications.

In 2018, Vowel contributed a poem to the critical anthology Refuse:  CanLit in Ruins, which engages with historical and current issues in Canadian literature.

In 2019, she contributed to the graphic novel anthology This Place:  150 Years Retold, which chronicles the last 150 years of colonialism in Canada through the perspectives of acclaimed Indigenous authors such as Richard Van Camp and Katherena Vermette.

Activism 
Vowel is well known for her work promoting the protection and preservation of Indigenous languages in Canada, critiquing the public perception that Indigenous languages are on the rise and highlighting the risk of these languages becoming extinct. Vowel's work has openly called for education reform in Canada and Indigenous control of Indigenous education.

In 2014 Vowel was responsible for the creation of the Idle No More: Blockade role-playing video game. This game is told from the perspective of a young Cree woman who is working to defend traditional land, with the hope of having players identify with the struggle of Indigenous communities and to learn about the Idle No More movement.

In 2018 OpenCanada included Vowel on their annual Twitterati list which highlights the work of Indigenous people responding to policy in Canada and abroad.

Bibliography

References 

Métis writers
Living people
Canadian bloggers
21st-century Canadian essayists
21st-century Canadian women writers
First Nations activists
Canadian women bloggers
Year of birth missing (living people)
Canadian women essayists